Bartelkeite is an exceptionally rare mineral, one of scarce natural germanium compounds. The formula was originally assumed to be PbFeGe3O8, bartelkeite was later shown to be isostructural with a high-pressure form of the mineral lawsonite. Thus, its correct formula is PbFeGe(Ge2O7)(OH)2•H2O. Bartelkeite and mathewrogersite are minerals with essential (dominant) lead, iron and germanium. Both come from Tsumeb, Namibia - a world's "capital" of germanium minerals.

Occurrence and association
Bartelkeite was detected in voids of germanium ore occurring within dolomites. The mineral associates with galena, germanite, reniérite, and tennantite.

Crystal structure
Bartelkeite is the first analyzed mineral containing both tetrahedrally- and octahedrally-coordinated germanium. It is isostructural with high-pressure form of the silicate lawsonite. In the structure there are:
 chains of FeO6 and GeO6 octahedra, that share edges 
 Ge2O7 dimers that cross-link the chains
 Pb atoms and water molecules in large cavities of the framework

References

Oxide minerals
Germanium minerals
Lead minerals
Iron(II) minerals
Monoclinic minerals
Minerals in space group 4
Minerals in space group 11